Obum Obum is a rural locality in the Scenic Rim Region, Queensland, Australia.

Geography 
The creeks that rise in the locality contribute ultimately to the Bremer River, which is a tributary of the Brisbane River which flows into Moreton Bay.

The predominant land use is grazing with some cropping.

History 
Obum Obum Provisional School opened on 24 January 1899. It became Obum Obum State School on 1 January 1909. It closed in 1946.

Education 
There are no schools in Obum Obum. The nearest primary schools are in Kalbar and Roadvale. The nearest secondary school is in Boonah.

References

Further reading 

 

Scenic Rim Region
Localities in Queensland